Connerré is a commune in the Sarthe department in the Pays de la Loire region of Northwestern France. In 2017, it had a population of 2,902.

Geography
Connerré is best known as where the LGV Atlantique meets the LGV Bretagne-Pays de la Loire.

See also
Communes of the Sarthe department

References

Communes of Sarthe
Maine (province)